Timothy Leonard Spall  (born 27 February 1957) is an English actor and presenter. Spall gained recognition for his character actor roles on stage and screen. He is best known for his collaborations with director Mike Leigh acting in six of his films Home Sweet Home (1982), Life is Sweet (1990), Secrets & Lies (1996), Topsy-Turvy (1999), All or Nothing (2002) and Mr. Turner (2014). He was nominated for the BAFTA for Best Actor in a Leading Role for his role in Secrets and Lies and received the Cannes Film Festival Best Actor Award for his portrayal of J. M. W. Turner in Mr. Turner. In 2000, he was appointed Officer of the Order of the British Empire (OBE) by Queen Elizabeth II.

He has appeared in many films, including Hamlet (1996), Still Crazy (1998), Nicholas Nickleby (2002), The Last Samurai (2003), Enchanted (2007), Sweeney Todd: The Demon Barber of Fleet Street (2007), The Damned United (2009), The King's Speech (2010), Ginger and Rosa (2012), Denial (2016), The Party (2017), and Spencer (2021). He voiced Nick, a cynical, portly rat in Chicken Run (2000). He also starred as Peter Pettigrew in five Harry Potter films, from Prisoner of Azkaban (2004) to Deathly Hallows – Part 1 (2010).

He gained prominence in the UK appearing as Barry Spencer Taylor in the 1983 ITV comedy-drama series Auf Wiedersehen, Pet. He starred in the television documentary Timothy Spall: ...at Sea (2010–2012) and in 2019 he appeared as Lord Arthur Wallington in the 6-part BBC Cold War drama Summer of Rockets.

Early life
Spall, the third of four sons, was born on 27 February 1957 in Battersea, London. His mother, Sylvia R. (née Leonard), was a hairdresser, and his father, Joseph L. Spall, was a postal worker. He trained at the National Youth Theatre and RADA, where he was awarded the Bancroft Gold Medal as the most promising actor in his year.

Career
Spall initially made his mark in theatre performing in productions for Birmingham Rep, including the UK premier of Arnold Wesker's The Merchant, and, later, the Royal Shakespeare Company, including The Merry Wives of Windsor, Three Sisters, Nicholas Nickleby and The Knight of the Burning Pestle. At The National Theatre Spall played the Dauphin in George Bernard Shaw's St Joan

Following a film debut in Quadrophenia and wider TV exposure playing the, as Wayne says, "gormless radish" [awkward] Barry Taylor in all four series of Auf Wiedersehen, Pet, Kevin in Outside Edge and as Aubrey the appalling chef in Mike Leigh's Life is Sweet, Spall has since appeared in the films Crusoe, Secrets & Lies, Shooting the Past, Topsy-Turvy, Vanilla Sky, Rock Star, All or Nothing, The Last Samurai, Lemony Snicket's A Series of Unfortunate Events and The King's Speech. He performed as Peter Pettigrew ("Wormtail") in the Harry Potter film series. In 1991 he guest starred in the series 5 Red Dwarf episode "Back to Reality". In 1993, Spall was a guest in the Scottish comedy series Rab C. Nesbitt.

He was appointed Officer of the Order of the British Empire (OBE) in the 2000 New Year Honours.

Spall performed lead vocals on the song "The Devil is an Englishman" from the Ken Russell film Gothic (1986), in which Spall portrayed John William Polidori. Spall played the starring role of Albert Pierrepoint in the 2005 film Pierrepoint, which was released as The Last Hangman in the United States. In the 2006 video game Grand Theft Auto: Vice City Stories, Spall voiced Phil Collins' manager, Barry Mickelthwaite. In 2007, he starred as Nathaniel in Disney's Enchanted and Beadle Bamford in Tim Burton's production of Sweeney Todd: The Demon Barber of Fleet Street. He also starred as Georgie Godwin in a one-off television drama The Fattest Man in Britain on ITV 1 which aired on 20 December 2009. The drama also featured Bobby Ball, Frances Barber, Aisling Loftus and Jeremy Kyle.

In 2010, he portrayed Winston Churchill in the film The King's Speech for which as a member of the ensemble he was jointly awarded the Screen Actors Guild Award for Outstanding Performance by a Cast in a Motion Picture. Spall reprised the role at the 2012 Summer Olympics closing ceremony.

In 2012, Spall filmed Wasteland (known as The Rise in Britain), with actors Matthew Lewis and Vanessa Kirby. The Newport Beach Film Festival in Newport Beach, California, screened Wasteland in April 2013. Also in 2012 Spall played Charlie Morgan in the edgy film Comes a Bright Day.

In 2014, he won the Best Actor Award at the 2014 Cannes Film Festival for Mr. Turner, a biographical film on J. M. W. Turner directed by Mike Leigh. In 2016, Spall portrayed Holocaust denier David Irving in the film Denial, directed by Mick Jackson.

From 29 March to 14 May 2016, Spall played the title role of Davies in Harold Pinter's play The Caretaker, directed by Matthew Warchus at the Old Vic theatre in London opposite George MacKay and Daniel Mays.

Spall went on to play Major Alistair Gregory in the acclaimed dramatic film Spencer (2021). He shared several psychologically charged scenes with Kristen Stewart who portrayed Princess Diana.

Personal life

Spall and his wife Shane have three children: Pascale (born 1976), Rafe (born 1983), who is also an actor, and Mercedes (born 1985). He lives in Forest Hill, South East London.

In 1996, Spall was diagnosed with acute myeloid leukaemia, but has since been in remission. He has said of his illness: I didn't know what made me ill but stress had something to do with it and the point is now to head off stress at the pass. It made me aware of things and become more selective. I am less worried about employment. I really do my homework so I am not getting stressed on the set because I don't know what I'm doing.

He is the owner of a Dutch barge, in which he and his wife sailed around the British Isles as part of a BBC Four TV series Timothy Spall: Back at Sea.

Filmography

Awards and nominations

References

External links

 
 
 Amy Raphael, "Spall in the Family," (Interview of Timothy Spall and actor son Rafe) The Observer, 28 October 2007
 Stuart Jeffries, "I don't always play losers," The Guardian, 5 November 2007

1957 births
Living people
20th-century English male actors
21st-century English male actors
Alumni of RADA
Audiobook narrators
Cannes Film Festival Award for Best Actor winners
English male film actors
English male Shakespearean actors
English male stage actors
English male television actors
English male voice actors
European Film Award for Best Actor winners
Male actors from London
National Youth Theatre members
Officers of the Order of the British Empire
Outstanding Performance by a Cast in a Motion Picture Screen Actors Guild Award winners
People from Battersea
Royal Shakespeare Company members